

Champions

Major League Baseball
American League
Boston Americans
National League
Pittsburgh Pirates
World Series
World Series: Boston Americans over Pittsburgh Pirates (5–3), in the first modern World Series

Minor League Baseball
American Association
St. Paul Saints
Central League
Fort Wayne Railroaders
Connecticut League
Holyoke Paperweights
Cotton States League
Baton Rouge Red Sticks
Eastern League
Jersey City Skeeters
Hudson River League
Hudson Marines
Illinois–Indiana–Iowa League
Bloomington Bloomers
Kentucky–Illinois–Tennessee League
Cairo Egyptians
Missouri Valley League
Sedalia Goldbugs
New England League
Lowell Tigers
New York State League
Schenectady Frog Alleys
Northern League
Winnipeg Maroons
Pacific Coast League
Los Angeles Angels
Pacific National League
Butte Miners
Southern Association
Memphis Egyptians
Southwest Washington League
Aberdeen Pippins
Texas League
Dallas Giants
Western League
Milwaukee Creams

College baseball
National title
Princeton Tigers

Western Conference
Illinois Fighting Illini

Major league baseball final standings

American League final standings

National League final standings

Events
January 3 - Frank J. Farrell and Bill Devery pay $18,000 for the defunct American League franchise in Baltimore and relocate the team to New York and called them the Highlanders. The Highlanders would years later receive a new team name and become the New York Yankees.
February 17 - The Brooklyn Superbas purchase the contracts of pitcher Rube Vickers and outfielder Harry Thielman from the Cincinnati Reds. 
March 7- The Detroit Tigers trade pitcher/infielder Kid Gleason to the New York Giants for second baseman Heinie Smith
April 20- Future hall of fame pitcher Chief Bender makes his major league debut for the Philadelphia Athletics at the age of 18.
May 6 – The Chicago White Stockings committed twelve errors, and the Detroit Tigers answered back with six of their own. The combined "18-E debacle" set a modern Major League record for the most errors (by two teams) in a single game.
May 7 – Pittsburgh Pirates outfielder Fred Clarke hits for the cycle for the second time in his career.  The Pirates lose to the Cincinnati Reds, however, 11–8.
June 21 – Boston Americans outfielder Buck Freeman hits for the cycle in a 12–7 Boston win over the Cleveland Naps.
June 25 – Wiley Piatt of the Boston Beaneaters became the only pitcher in the 20th century to lose two complete games in one day. Piatt allowed fourteen hits, while striking out twelve, en route to 1–0 and 5-3 St. Louis Cardinals victories.
June 29 – Patsy Dougherty, outfielder for the Boston Americans, hits for the cycle against the Chicago White Stockings leading Boston to a 7–2 win.
July 1- Cy Young drives in the lone run to lead Boston to a 1–0 victory over Chicago.
August 17- The Detroit Tigers release second baseman Heinie Smith, whom they acquired via trade prior to the start of the season. 
September 3 – Cleveland Naps rookie Jesse Stovall tosses an 11-inning shutout, 1–0, over the Detroit Tigers.  The feat still remains as the longest shutout ever for a major league pitching debut.
September 18 – Chick Fraser pitches a no-hitter for the Philadelphia Phillies in the second game of a doubleheader against the Chicago Cubs. The Phillies win, 10–0.
September 24 – Cleveland Naps third baseman Bill Bradley hits for the cycle against the Washington Senators in a 12–2 Cleveland win.
October 1 – In Game 1 of the first modern World Series in Major League Baseball, Pittsburgh Pirates outfielder Jimmy Sebring becomes the first player to hit a home run in the World Series when he connects for a solo shot off of Boston's Cy Young in the seventh inning.  The Pirates beat the Americans, 7–3.
 October 2 – Boston Americans outfielder Patsy Dougherty becomes the first player to hit multiple home runs in a World Series game when he hits solo home runs in the first and sixth inning of Game 2 in Boston's 3–0 win over the Pittsburgh Pirates.
October 13 – The Boston Americans defeat the Pittsburgh Pirates, 3–0, in Game 8 of the first World Series. Boston wins the series, five games to three.

Births

January
January 3 – Herb Bradley
January 4 – Alex Metzler
January 6 – Ike Eichrodt
January 6 – George Grant
January 6 – Mul Holland
January 14 – Phil Piton
January 14 – Russ Scarritt
January 15 – Tom Oliver
January 18 – Nolen Richardson
January 19 – Fred Lucas
January 19 – Merle Settlemire
January 23 – Jack Saltzgaver
January 24 – Clay Touchstone
January 27 – Art Reinholz
January 27 – Earl Williams
January 31 – Abie Hood

February
February 1 – Carl Reynolds
February 3 – Joe Stripp
February 10 – Walt Lerian
February 10 – Johnny Lucas
February 10 – George Quellich
February 12 – Chick Hafey
February 12 – Andy Harrington
February 14 – Uel Eubanks
February 21 – Tom Yawkey
February 23 – Roy Johnson

March
March 2 – Art Mills
March 5 – Chick Autry
March 11 – Buster Ross
March 11 – Art Ruble
March 27 – Joe Dwyer

April
April 4 – Les Bartholomew
April 6 – Mickey Cochrane
April 8 – Frank Mulroney
April 13 – Ken Jones
April 16 – Paul Waner
April 17 – Elmer Miller
April 17 – Bob Osborn
April 24 – Jimmy Moore
April 25 – John Wilson
April 26 – Dale Alexander
April 28 – Fred Schemanske

May
May 1 – Fritz Knothe
May 11 – Charlie Gehringer
May 14 – Doc Land
May 17 – Cool Papa Bell
May 22 – Mel Kerr
May 23 – Charlie Sullivan
May 24 – Jack Berly

June
June 3 – Chappie Geygan
June 5 – Billy Urbanski
June 9 – Mike Ryba
June 13 – Carroll Yerkes
June 17 – Ben Shields
June 19 – Lou Gehrig
June 22 – Carl Hubbell
June 26 – Babe Herman
June 26 – George Milstead

July
July 8 – Clint Brown
July 10 – Johnny Niggeling
July 12 – George Darrow
July 18 – Hod Kibbie
July 20 – Howard Maple
July 28 – George Gerken

August
August 6 – Jim Turner
August 6 – Hal Wiltse
August 8 – Clise Dudley
August 13 – Steve Swetonic
August 19 – Estel Crabtree
August 27 – Charlie Engle
August 27 – Marv Gudat
August 29 – Jack Warner

September
September 1 – Foster Edwards
September 1 – Freddie Moncewicz
September 6 – Tommy Thevenow
September 7 – Curt Davis
September 7 – Nap Kloza
September 7 – Al Van Camp
September 12 – Len Dondero
September 13 – Rabbit Warstler
September 19 – Carl Lind
September 22 – Chuck Hostetler
September 28 – Jim Brillheart
September 28 – Hank Grampp

October
October 4 – Lefty Thomas
October 7 – Bill Walker
October 9 – Walter O'Malley
October 9 – Jack Tising
October 10 – Fay Thomas
October 12 – Jack Crouch
October 12 – Dutch Holland
October 15 – Mule Haas
October 18 – Yats Wuestling
October 20 – Archie Campbell
October 28 – Hank Boney
October 30 – Mickey Heath

November
November 2 – Elon Hogsett
November 2 – Travis Jackson
November 13 – Si Rosenthal
November 18 – George Blackerby
November 23 – Joe Muich
November 25 – Jim Weaver
November 27 – Bill Hohman

December
December 2 – Don Brennan
December 6 – Tony Lazzeri
December 11 – Ray Phelps
December 13 – Al Smith
December 14 – Jim Moore
December 17 – Ted Trent
December 25 – Red Barnes

Deaths
January 12 – Win Mercer, 28, pitcher for four teams from 1894 to 1902, who posted two 20-win seasons and led the National League in games started, shutouts, and saves in the 1897 season.
January 13 – Pete Conway, 36, pitcher who posted a 61–61 record for four teams from 1885 to 1889.
February 6 – Hardie Henderson, 40, pitcher who went 81–121 with four teams between 1883 and 1888.
February 11 – Sam McMackin, [?], pitcher who played with the Chicago White Sox and Detroit Tigers in the 1902 season.
February 15 – Phil Reccius, 40, played third base for eight seasons, most notably for the Louisville Eclipse/Colonels.
February 20 – Al Dwight, 47, pitcher for the 1884 Kansas City Cowboys.
May 2 – Odie Porter, 25, pitcher who played briefly for the 1902 Philadelphia Athletics.
May 3 – Count Sensenderfer, 55, played for the Philadelphia Athletics from 1871 to 1874.  Later became a politician.
May 13 – Thomas Lynch, 40, pitcher who played for the Chicago White Stockings in the 1884 season.
May 16 – Chicken Wolf, 41, right fielder for 11 years, 10 with the Louisville Colonels.
June 22 – Fatty Briody, 44, catcher for eight seasons from 1880 to 1888.
July 1 – Jimmy Cooney, 37, shortstop for the Chicago Colts and Washington Senators National League teams from 1890 to 1892.
July 2 – Ed Delahanty, 35, slugging left fielder since 1888, a three-time .400 hitter who ranked second only to Cap Anson in career hits; died after falling from a railroad trestle crossing the Niagara River.
August 1 – Charlie Bohn, 47, outfielder/pitcher who played for the 1882 Louisville Eclipse.
August 2 – Bill Sweeney, [?], pitcher/outfielder for the 1882 Philadelphia Athletics and the 1884 Baltimore Monumentals.
August 21 – Andy Leonard, 57, left fielder for the original Cincinnati Red Stockings, the first fully professional baseball team.
October 10 – John Valentine, 47, umpire from 1884 to 1888, who previously pitched for the 1883 Columbus Buckeyes.
October 22 – Joe Yingling, 36, pitcher for the 1886 Washington Nationals.
November 5 – Harrison Peppers, 37, pitcher for the Louisville Colonels during the 1894 season.
November 12 – John Gilbert, 39, shortstop for the 1890 Pittsburgh Alleghenys.
November 28 – Jack Easton, 38, pitcher who posted a 26–29 record in 76 games for the Columbus Solons, St. Louis Browns, and Pittsburgh Pirates from 1889 to 1894.
December 30 – Dan Leahy, 33, shortstop for the 1896 Philadelphia Phillies.
December 31 – Joe McGuckin, 41, outfielder for the 1890 Baltimore Orioles of the American Association.

References